Jonathan Loughran is an American actor who is in most Happy Madison films with his friend and actor Adam Sandler.

He is Sandler's longtime friend and assistant, who has at least 40 credits with Sandler to his name.

Filmography

 Sexbomb (1989) as Barry
 Bulletproof (1996) as Rookie Cop 
 The Waterboy (1998) as Lyle Robideaux 
 Big Daddy (1999) as Mike 
 Late Last Night (1999) as Nitro 
 Little Nicky (2000) as John
 Undeclared (2001) as Himself
 Punch-Drunk Love (2002) as Wrong Number
 The Master of Disguise (2002) as Security Guard 
 Eight Crazy Nights (2002) as Cop #1 (voice)
 National Security (2003) as Sarcastic Cop
 Anger Management (2003) as Nate 
 Dickie Roberts: Former Child Star (2003) as Himself 
 Kill Bill: Volume 1 (2003) as Trucker
 50 First Dates (2004) as Jennifer 
 Kill Bill: Volume 2 (2004) as Trucker 
 Grandma's Boy (2006) as Josh
 The Benchwarmers (2006) as Brad's Assistant Coach 
 The King of Queens (2006-2007) as Bobby
 Death Proof (2007) as Jasper
 I Now Pronounce You Chuck & Larry (2007) as David Nootzie
 Get Smart (2008) as Orange Team Guy
 The House Bunny (2008) as Tall Prostitute 
 Bedtime Stories (2008) as Party Guest
 Finding Sandler (2009) as Himself
 Grown Ups (2010) as Robideaux
 MKC: The Monster Killers Club (2010) as Walt P.
 The Great Marcusio (2010) as Gil
 Mobsters (2011) as Jerry Giggles
 Just Go with It (2011) as Pick Up Guy #1 
 Bucky Larson: Born to Be a Star (2011) as Bondage Guy 
 Jack and Jill (2011) as Monica's Boyfriend
 Grown Ups 2 (2013) as Robideaux
 Blended (2014) as Umpire
 Pixels (2015) as White House Gate Guard
 Hotel Transylvania 2 (2015) as Cop (voice, uncredited)
 The Ridiculous 6 (2015) as Rifleman
 The Do-Over (2016) as Grizzly-Looking Biker
 Hell's Kitchen (2016) as Himself
 Sandy Wexler (2017) as Trucker Jon
 Murder Mystery (2019) as Man at Train Station
 The Wrong Missy (2020) as Paul

See also
Johnny, a character from the Hotel Transylvania franchise starring Sandler is also named Jonathan Loughran

References

External links

American male film actors
Living people
Male actors from Philadelphia
Place of birth missing (living people)
Year of birth missing (living people)